This is a list of census-designated places in Nebraska. The United States Census Bureau defines census-designated places as unincorporated communities lacking elected municipal officers and boundaries with legal status.

As of the 2020 census, Nebraska has 61 census-designated places, up from 50 in the 2010 census. Most CDPs in the state are small rural communities, although the list also includes a few bigger communities and suburbs. A total of 24,617 people live in Nebraska's CDPs, or 1,26% of the population.

Census-designated places

See also 
 List of counties in Nebraska
 List of cities in Nebraska
 List of townships in Nebraska
 List of villages in Nebraska

Notes

References 

 
Nebraska
census-designated places